The 1932–33 Egypt Cup was the 13th edition of the Egypt Cup.

The final was held on 13 May 1934. The match was contested by Zamalek and Olympic Club, with Olympic winning 1–0.

Quarter-finals

Semi-finals

Final

References 

 

3
Egypt Cup
1933–34 in Egyptian football